The International Association of Dental Students (IADS) is a non-governmental organization representing interests of dental students worldwide. It was founded in August 1951 in Copenhagen, Denmark, and currently has more than 200,000 students from 60 countries.

History 
In February 1951, the national organization of French stomatology students invited some of their colleagues from other countries to attend their annual meeting in Paris, France, where the Danish, Dutch and Swedish representatives proposed to establish international dental students' organization. Such proposal was unanimously welcomed.

A committee consisting of representatives from Denmark, the Netherlands and the United Kingdom was formed to work out the basic principles on which to build the constitution of the association. This constitution was drafted and the first executive committee was elected; Leslie Sorling from Sweden was elected the first president.

Congress 
Two international meetings take place each year to offer the opportunity for dental students delegates to come together to discuss their current issues and future strategies. One of these two meetings is called the Mid Year Meeting (MYM) and usually takes place by the end of each winter, while the other one is the Annual Congress (AC) which takes place by the end of each summer.

Green Dentistry Day 
Green Dentistry is a joint project between IADS and Freier Verband Deutscher Zahnärzte (FVDZ) Student Chamber with the goal to raise awareness in dental practitioners and teach them how to change their routines towards a profitable and eco-friendly workflow for their future dental practices.
Because in the last 20 years the trash produced per dental clinic has strongly increased, the tendency to use more and more single-use instruments (disposable) in the dental field and to be economically prepared for Future regulation.

Green Dentistry Day is held each year on 22 May. It was launched in 2020 by competition among worldwide dental students in order to promote green dentistry.

See also 
 Dental Students' Scientific Association of Egypt (DSSA-Egypt)
 International Federation of Medical Students Associations (IFMSA)
 International Pharmaceutical Students' Federation (IPSF)
 World Dental Federation (FDI)

References 

Dental organizations
Dentistry education
International medical and health organizations
International organisations based in Switzerland
Dental
Medical and health foundations
Medical and health student organizations
Organisations based in Geneva
Student government